Gerard van den Bergh (19 November 1882 – 22 October 1949) was a Dutch sports shooter. He competed at the 1908 Summer Olympics and the 1920 Summer Olympics.

References

External links
 

1882 births
1949 deaths
Dutch male sport shooters
Olympic shooters of the Netherlands
Shooters at the 1908 Summer Olympics
Shooters at the 1920 Summer Olympics
Sportspeople from The Hague